The 2012 European Women's Handball Championship was held in Serbia from 4 to 16 December. Originally the tournament was scheduled to be held in the Netherlands but on 4 June 2012 the Dutch Handball Federation withdrew from the organization. Subsequently, the European Handball Federation (EHF) launched a new bidding process and eventually selected Serbia as the new host on 18 June 2012.

Montenegro captured their first title by defeating defending champion Norway 34–31 in the final.

Host selection
Initially on its meeting on 27 September 2008 the EHF awarded the championship to the Netherlands, beating the bids of Germany and Serbia. This could have been the second time for Netherlands to host the tournament, however, on 4 June 2012 the Dutch Handball Federation announced they are unable to organize the European Championship. A day later the EHF re-launched the host selection process; ten nations had shown interest in organizing the competition, including Croatia, Denmark, Iceland, Macedonia, Norway, Poland, Russia, Serbia, Slovakia and Sweden. Romania added their interest the day after. On 18 June 2012 the EHF granted the organizational rights to Serbia and also disposed of the fate of the Dutch national team. Since Serbia, the new host already qualified for the European Championship, the place reserved for the host nation was passed to Iceland as the best non-qualified team and the Netherlands were pulled out from the tournament.

Venues
Five venues in four cities had been selected to host the matches:

Qualification 

Qualification matches were played from September 2011 to June 2012. Following the new system introduced for the 2010 Men's Championship, all teams were included in the qualification round, except Netherlands who were hosts before the withdrawal. Teams were divided in 7 groups and the two top ranked teams from each group qualified.

Qualified teams

1 Bold indicates champion for that year.

Squads

Referees
12 referee pairs were selected:

Seeding
The draw was scheduled to be held on 6 June 2012 at 14:00 local time in Rotterdam, Netherlands. The draw procedure was announced on 15 May. It was canceled because of the withdrawal of the Dutch Handball Federation. The draw was rescheduled to 22 June 2012 in Monaco. The pots were new assigned due to the removal of the Netherlands and the addition of Iceland.

Preliminary round
The draw was held on 22 June 2012. The playing schedule was released on 13 July.

All times are local (UTC+1).

Group A

Group B

Group C

Group D

Main round

Group I

Group II

Knockout stage

Bracket

Semifinals

Fifth place game

Third place game

Final

Final ranking and statistics

All-Star Team

Top goalscorers

Source: SportResult.com

Top goalkeepers

Source: SportResult.com

References

External links

EHF Website 

 
European Women's Handball Championship
European Women's Handball Championship
European Women's Handball Championship
International handball competitions hosted by Serbia
Women's handball in Serbia
December 2012 sports events in Europe
International sports competitions in Belgrade
Sports competitions in Novi Sad
2010s in Belgrade
21st century in Novi Sad
Sport in Niš
Sport in Vršac